The 2005 American Handball Men's Youth Championships took place in Brusque from September 6–10.

Teams

Preliminary round

Group A

Group B

Placement 5th–7th

Final round

Semifinals

Bronze medal match

Gold medal match

Final standing

References 
 brasilhandebol.com.br

2005 in handball
Pan American Men's Youth Handball Championship
2005 in Brazilian sport